Christian Huriwai (born 1 February 1992) is an extreme street unicyclist from Kaikohe, New Zealand. He is the former and three time street world champion after taking the title from Adrien Delecroix during UNICON XV, in Wellington, New Zealand in 2009–10.

Chris Huriwai runs his own unicycle team, Hippo Unicycles, focusing on increasing unicycle participation and creating a base of content for extreme unicycling in New Zealand and Australia.

Chris Huriwai created UniQuest, "an online unicycle tutorial series, to give aspiring unicyclists the guidance that (he) received from (his) role models when (he) started".

He is a vegan, and co-produced the 2021 documentary Milked, in which he investigates various negative effects of New Zealand's dairy industry on the environment, health, and animals.

References

Unicyclists
New Zealand male cyclists
Living people
1992 births
People from Kaikohe

Māori activists
Animal rights activists